Antal Hekler (1 February 1882 – 3 March 1940) was a Hungarian/German classical archaeologist and art historian. He was a member of the Hungarian Academy of Sciences.

Life
He wrote his doctoral thesis in political science in 1903 and then studied  classical archaeology in Munich under Adolf Furtwängler, where he wrote his second doctoral thesis, before he returned to his birthplace Budapest, where he first worked at the city's national museum and later held a chair for Christian archaeology and history of art at the Faculty of Sciences of the University of Budapest.

He went on dedicating himself to ancient art, but also to Hungarian art history. At Hekler's instigation the Budapest Museum of Fine Arts purchased 135 Greek, Roman and Italian sculptures from the Munich collection of Paul Arndt in 1908. Later another 650 terracotta sculptures were added from Arndt's collection.

From 1926 when she graduated until 1936 art historian Anna Zádor volunteered to work for Hekler. She then suffered persecution.

His book Die Bildniskunst der Griechen & Römer (“Greek and Roman Portraits”), published in Stuttgart and London in 1912 soon was to become a widespread standard work, also translated into other languages.

Publications

 Die Bildniskunst der Griechen & Römer, Hoffmann, Stuttgart 1912
 A Klasszicizmus jelentősége és térfoglalása az ókori művészetben, A budavári tudományos társaság, Budapest 1921
 Die Kunst des Phidias, Hoffmann, Stuttgart 1924
 Die Sammlung antiker Skulpturen, Krystall, Vienna 1929 (Die Budapester Sammlungen. Die Antiken in Budapest, Abt. 1)
 Budapest als Kunststadt, Lindner, Küssnacht 1933
 Die Universität Budapest, Lindner, Basel 1935
 Ungarische Kunstgeschichte, Mann, Berlin 1937
 Bildnisse berühmter Griechen, Kupferberg, Berlin 1940 (3. edition, expanded by Helga von Heintze 1962)

Further reading

 Wolfgang Schiering: Anhang. In: Reinhard Lullies, Wolfgang Schiering (edd.) Archäologenbildnisse. Porträts und Kurzbiographien von Klassischen Archäologen deutscher Sprache. Zabern, Mainz 1988, S. 331.

References

External links 
 

1882 births
1940 deaths
20th-century Hungarian people
Archaeologists from Budapest
Hungarian art historians
Hungarian expatriates in Germany
Writers from Budapest
Academic staff of Eötvös Loránd University